Pegomya depressiventris is a species of root-maggot fly (insects in the family Anthomyiidae).

References

Anthomyiidae
Articles created by Qbugbot
Insects described in 1845